The 2000 LSU Tigers baseball team represented Louisiana State University in the 2000 NCAA Division I baseball season. The Tigers played their home games at Alex Box Stadium. The team was coached by Skip Bertman in his 17th season at LSU.

The Tigers won the College World Series, defeating the Stanford Cardinal in the championship game for Bertman's fifth and final national championship at LSU.

Roster

Schedule and results

Schedule Source:

Awards and honors 
Blair Barbier
 College World Series All-Tournament Team
 SEC Tournament All-Tournament Team

Brad Cresse
 Johnny Bench Award
 All-America First Team
 All-SEC First Team

Mike Fontenot
 College World Series All-Tournament Team
 Freshman All-America First Team
 SEC Freshman of the Year
 College World Series All-Tournament Team

Cedrick Harris
 SEC Tournament All-Tournament Team

Brad Hawpe
 College World Series All-Tournament Team
 All-America Second Team
 SEC Tournament All-Tournament Team

Trey Hodges
 College World Series Most Outstanding Player

Bo Pettit
 Freshman All-America Honorable Mention

Wally Pontiff
 Freshman All-America Honorable Mention
 SEC Tournament Most Outstanding Player
 SEC Tournament All-Tournament Team

Brian Tallet
 All-America Second Team
 SEC Tournament All-Tournament Team

Ryan Theriot
 College World Series All-Tournament Team

Tigers in the 2000 MLB Draft 
The following members of the LSU Tigers baseball program were drafted in the 2000 Major League Baseball Draft.

References 

Lsu
LSU Tigers baseball seasons
NCAA Division I Baseball Championship seasons
College World Series seasons
Southeastern Conference baseball champion seasons
LSU Tigers base
LSU